Hallet Valley is a valley between Medley Ridge and Vortex Col in the western Asgard Range of Victoria Land, Antarctica. It was named by the Advisory Committee on Antarctic Names in 2004 after Bernard Hallet, of the Quaternary Research Center at the University of Washington, Seattle, who was a United States Antarctic Program investigator of land surface stability in the McMurdo Dry Valleys, 1995–2002.

References

Valleys of Victoria Land
McMurdo Dry Valleys